The Dadi Dadi or Tatitati are an Australian Aboriginal people whose traditional lands are located along the southern banks of the Murray River in Victoria Australia.

Language
The Dadi Dadi language is a nearly extinct member of the Lower Murray languages, which form a branch of the Pama-Nyungan language family. During the 1960s and 1970s samples of the language were recorded by Luise Hercus. The language is related to Yita Yita. Most of the tribal names of this group (Nari-Nari, Barababaraba, Latjilatji, Warkawarka, Watiwati, Wemba-Wemba) are formed by a reduplication of the word for 'no' in their respective languages, the word 'tati' bearing that sense.

Country
Though mainly concentrated on the southern bank of the Murray River, they also ranged as far north as Benanee. As part of the Murray–Darling basin, the area's history of human habitation goes back some 27,000-36,000 years.

Social organization
The Dadi Dadi, much like the Latjilatji, were divided into two moieties, the Kailpara and Makwara, with descent from the mother's side.

History of contact
Smallpox and other introduced diseases had already ravaged the Murray Valley aboriginal population before the actual establishment of colonial 'runs' or pastoral properties in the region. Charles Sturt in 1830 described a particularly dire state of ill-health, ascribing it to leprosy. During colonial times bodies were removed from five aboriginal burial sites by George Murray Black, along the New South Wales side of the Murray River and are now part of the Murray Black Collection. The repatriation of these bodies is now being sought by tribal groups.

Alternative names
 Darty-Darty
 Nimp-mam-wern (lit. 'light lip')
 Tataty, Tatatha, Tat(h)i, Ta-ta-thi, Tar-tarthee, Ta-tathi, Taa-tatty
 Tunggut

Source:

Some words
 bet. (father)
 malol. (wife)
 met. (father's father)
 mim. (father's mother)
 paka. (mother's mother)
 tamburay.  (frilled lizard)
 ŋak (mother)
 ŋatai (mother's father)

Source:

Notes

Citations

Sources

Aboriginal peoples of Victoria (Australia)
History of Victoria (Australia)